César David Martínez (born 26 February 1986) is a Paraguayan footballer.

He played for clubs like San Lorenzo or Chilean team Lota Schwager.

References
 

1986 births
Living people
Paraguayan footballers
Paraguayan expatriate footballers
Sportivo Luqueño players
Silvio Pettirossi footballers
The Strongest players
Lota Schwager footballers
Primera B de Chile players
Expatriate footballers in Chile
Expatriate footballers in Bolivia
Association football midfielders